Portuguese chicken, also known as Portuguese-style chicken or galinha à portuguesa is a dish found in Macanese cuisine.

Despite its name, Portuguese chicken did not originate from Portugal, but from its former colony Macau. The dish is not found in Portuguese cuisine.

The dish consists of chicken pieces served with Portuguese sauce, which is likened to a mild yellow curry.

References

See also
 List of chicken dishes

Baked foods
Chinese chicken dishes
Macanese cuisine
Portuguese fusion cuisine